The Second Prefectural Assembly Elections  were held on 20 November 1940 in Taiwan under Japanese rule. According to the Japanese law, half members of prefectural assembly shall be elected by the members of local assembly and the other half be appointed by the Governor-General . In this time, 82 seats from five prefectural assemblies were open for election. Voting was done by Electoral colleges (EC) form by the more than 3,600 members of local assemblies. Around half of them were directly elected in the previous year, the other half were appointed by the prefectural governor .

The 1944 election was cancelled due to World War II, hence the tenure of the elected and appointed councillors were extended until the surrender of Japan in 1945.

Electoral College size 

Only around 0.067% of the population were eligible to vote in the election, which includes 861 (or 0.29% of) "Japan Mainlanders"  on Taiwan and 2,824 (or 0.055% of) "Taiwan Islanders" .

Result 
All 82 seats were elected. The overall turnout was at 98.51%, of which Taiwanese was higher than Japanese. 6 invalid electoral votes were found and 55 did not cast their votes. Amongst the elected prefectural assembly, 44 were Japanese and 38 were Taiwanese. The Governor-General then appointed 76 members, most of them were Japanese.

References 

1940
1940 in Taiwan
1940 elections in Asia